Fernando Rees (born January 4, 1985) is a retired Brazilian racecar driver. He started his career racing with go-karts back in 1993 at age 8. Fernando made his international single-seaters' debut in 2001, his endurance racing debut in 2007, and has recently competed in various international racing championships.

Career Information

Single-Seaters' Years (2001 - 2006)

Rees was born in São Paulo. In late 2003, he was given a private test by Mercedes-Benz on the Portuguese circuit of Estoril. On December 11, 2003, Mercedes-Benz had organized a Formula 3 test among its official client teams of the Formula 3 Euroseries. Only six drivers were selected to take part in the test: Fernando Rees, Robert Kubica, Jamie Green, Bruno Spengler, Alexandre Premat and Adrian Sutil. In the single test day, Rees topped the time sheets driving the ASM Mercedes-Benz car. Later in the same year, Ron Dennis picked the ASM Mercedes-Benz team for Lewis Hamilton to drive in the upcoming Formula 3 Euroseries championship, and Rees was forced to look elsewhere to compete.

After four years competing in the major single-seater categories in Europe (2001–2005), and having proved himself driving for the low budget team Interwetten.com in World Series by Renault during its 2005 season, Rees was awarded a test in the renowned Italian dream Draco Racing in the winter of that same year. With more than 30 drivers on track, including 2005 season champion Robert Kubica, Rees lead the field in the demanding track of Valencia, with more than half a second gap to Pastor Maldonado, who emerged second. The test opened new doors for the Brazilian driver, and 2006 was a promising year.

But in early 2006, at the Italian circuit of Monza, Rees was unfortunately involved in a shunt during a  Formula 3000 International Masters test day, under heavy rain, and was seriously injured. Rees had two broken vertebrae, three compressed vertebrae, a broken ankle, and other excoriations in both legs. As a consequence, Rees was away from motor racing for a period of 18 months - of which 12 months were spent under serious immobilization, and the remaining 6 months with continuous physiotherapy sessions.

Endurance Racing Years (2007 - 2015)

With his convalescence complete, Rees made his sportscar debut in the last Le Mans Series event of 2007, the Mil Milhas of Interlagos. Racing for Larbre Compétition with an Aston Martin DBR9, together with drivers Roland Berville, Gregor Fisken and Steve Zacchia, Rees took a clear win in the GT1 class after almost nine hours of racing. Rees decided to remain in the Le Mans Series for the following season.

Rees made his debut in the LMP2 class of the Le Mans Series in the second round of the 2008 championship, in Monza. In 2009, Rees signed once again with the Barazi-Epsilon team in the LMP2 class of the Le Mans Series. For this season, Barazi-Epsilon decided to run a two-drivers team, with Rees and Juan Barazi. But soon after the second race of the championship, in Spa-Francorchamps, the team announced its retirement from the 2009 Le Mans Series championship because of financial problems. Rees was left without a team to race for the remaining season of 2009.

In 2010 Rees returned to Larbre Compétition in the Le Mans Series, the same team with which he won the Interlagos round of the championship in 2007 - at that time, driving an Aston Martin DBR9. In 2010, after wins in the opening event at Paul Ricard, at the Algarve, and Hungaroring, and a fourth place in Spa-Francorchamps, Larbre Compétition secured the Team's Championship with its Saleen S7-R in the GT1 category. Rees went on to win his third race in the 2010 championship at Silverstone, in the closure of the season. Larbre Compétition also won the 2010 edition of the prestigious 24 Hours of Le Mans.

After a brief hiatus in 2011, Rees signed with Larbre Compétition for the FIA World Endurance Championship in 2012. Rees drove the team's #50 Corvette in the GT-Am category, replacing Pedro Lamy after the initial round of the championship at Sebring. Alongside his teammates Pedro Lamy, Julien Canal, and Patrick Bornhauser, Rees helped Larbre Compétition to win the world championship in the new FIA endurance series.

In 2013, Rees signed once more with Larbre Compétition for the second season of the FIA World Endurance Championship. Again, the team entered the #50 Chevrolet Corvette C6.R in the GT-Am category. Rees ended the season in 7th place.

Racing Career Stats
 2012: FIA World Endurance Championship (Team - Larbre Compétition)
 4 races, best start 2nd (Bahrain, Race 6); best race result 1st (Interlagos, Race 5)
 2010: Le Mans Series (Team - Larbre Compétition)
 4 races, best start 1st (Hungaroring, Race 4; Silverstone, Race 5); best race result 1st (Algarve, Race 3; Hungaroring, Race 4; Silverstone, Race 5)
 2009: Le Mans Series (Team - Barazi-Epsilon)
 1 race, best start 5th (Spa-Francorchamps, Race 2); best race result 4th (Spa-Francorchamps, Race 2)
 2008: Le Mans Series (Team - Barazi-Epsilon)
 4 races, best start 2nd (Silverstone, Race 5); best race result 8th (Nurburgring, Race 4)
 2007: Le Mans Series (Team - Larbre Compétition)
 1 race, best start 2nd (Interlagos, Race 6); best race result 1st (Interlagos, Race 6)
 2006:  Formula 3000 International Masters (Team - Pro Motorsport)
 2005: World Series by Renault 3.5 (Team - Interwetten)
 12 races, best start 5th (Donington, Race 2); best race result 14th (Bilbao, Race 2)
 2005: Formula Toyota Atlantic (Team - Brooks Associates Racing)
 1 race, best start 3rd (Long Beach, Race 1); best race result DNF (16th) (Long Beach, Race 1)
 2004: Formula 3 Euroseries (Swiss Racing Team) - Formula 3 Euroseries tests with ASM Mercedes-Benz
 2 races with Swiss Racing Team
 2003: F3 Sudamericana (Team Cesario Formula) - Formula 3 Euroseries tests with ASM Mercedes
 12 races, best start 3rd (Interlagos); best race result 1st (Interlagos)
 Five third-place finishes, Sixth in Championship (did not compete in all the races)
 2002: Formula Renault 2000 Eurocup (Team RC Motorsports) - Italian Formula Renault 2000 (Team RC Motorsports)
 9 races, best start 5th (Imola), best race result 12th (Pergusa)
 2001: Italian Formula Renault 2000 (Team Bicar Racing)
 1 race, best start 7th (Misano), best race result 13th (Misano)

Complete Formula Renault 3.5 Series results 
(key) (Races in bold indicate pole position) (Races in italics indicate fastest lap)

† Driver did not finish the race, but was classified as he completed more than 90% of the race distance.

Complete FIA World Endurance Championship results
(key) (Races in bold indicate pole position; races in
italics indicate fastest lap)

24 Hours of Le Mans results

Karting Career Stats
 2001: Karting in Italian and European Championships (Birel Official Factory Team)
 2000: Karting in Italian, European and World Championships (Danilo Rossi Racing Team)
 1999: Karting in Italian and European Championships (Danilo Rossi Racing Team)
 1998: Karting in Brazilian National Championships and North-American Championships (CRG Official Factory Team)
 1997: Karting in Brazilian National Championships
 1996: Karting in Brazilian National Championships
 1995: Karting in Brazilian National Championships
 1994: Karting in Brazilian National Championships
 1993: Karting in Interlagos, São Paulo, Brazil

References

External links
 
 

1985 births
Living people
Racing drivers from São Paulo
Brazilian racing drivers
Italian Formula Renault 2.0 drivers
Formula Renault Eurocup drivers
Formula 3 Euro Series drivers
Formula 3 Sudamericana drivers
Atlantic Championship drivers
European Le Mans Series drivers
World Series Formula V8 3.5 drivers
FIA World Endurance Championship drivers
24 Hours of Le Mans drivers
International GT Open drivers
Aston Martin Racing drivers
Larbre Compétition drivers
RC Motorsport drivers
Ombra Racing drivers
Nürburgring 24 Hours drivers
Craft-Bamboo Racing drivers